Beatriz "Gigi" Fernández (born February 22, 1964) is a Puerto Rican former professional tennis player.
Fernández won 17 major doubles titles and two Olympic gold medals representing the United States, and reached the world No. 1 ranking in doubles. She reached a career-high singles ranking of world No. 17 in 1991. Since retiring from the professional tour in 1997 at the age of 33, Fernández has been a tennis coach and entrepreneur. She now shares her knowledge of doubles with tennis enthusiasts throughout the US by conducting Master Doubles with Gigi Clinics and Doubles Boot Camps. Fernández is the first Puerto Rican to be inducted into the International Tennis Hall of Fame.

Career
Fernández was recognized primarily as a doubles specialist during her professional career. She won a career doubles Grand Slam with 17 Grand Slam women's doubles title – six French Open, five US Open, four Wimbledon, and two Australian Open winning at least one Grand Slam title every year from 1988 to 1997, except 1989, and for three straight years winning three of the four Grand Slam doubles titles in the same year (1992–1994). She won 14 of her 17 Grand Slam titles partnering Natasha Zvereva; their partnership is the second most successful doubles pair  in the Open era after Martina Navratilova and Pam Shriver.

In mixed doubles, Fernández was the runner-up in three of the four Grand Slam mixed doubles events in 1995 (Australian Open, Wimbledon, and US Open) partnering Cyril Suk. Fernández captured 68 career titles in women's doubles and reached the world No. 1 doubles ranking in 1991 and attained the No. 1 ranking again in 1993, 1994 and 1995. She won a total of 69 doubles titles during her career.

Fernández represented the United States at the Olympic Games in 1992 (Barcelona) and 1996 (Atlanta). She teamed with Mary Joe Fernández (no relation) to win the women's doubles gold medal on both occasions. The first gold medal was won against the home team of Conchita Martínez and Arantxa Sánchez Vicario with the king and queen of Spain in the audience. The two medals are on Fernández's desk, and a license plate on her car states "DBL GLD".

Fernández represented Puerto Rico when San Juan played host to the Pan Am Games in 1979. Just 15, Fernández won a bronze medal. In 1982 at the Central American-Caribbean Games in Cuba, she teamed with Marilda Julia to win doubles gold and won a silver medal in the singles as well. She represented Puerto Rico at the 1984 Olympics.

Fernández was also on the United States team that won the Federation Cup in 1990.

In singles, Fernández reached as high as world No. 17. She also won two top-level titles and reached the semifinals at Wimbledon in 1994 (ranked 99 becoming the lowest-ranked Grand Slam singles semifinalist at Wimbledon) and the quarterfinals at the US Open in 1991 and 1994.

Fernández retired from the professional tour in 1997, and in 1999, she was named Puerto Rico's "Female Athlete of the Century".

On July 12, 2010, Fernández was inducted in the International Tennis Hall of Fame with Zvereva.

Personal life
Her parents are Tuto Fernández, a well-known doctor in Puerto Rico, and Beatriz Fernández. Her cousin José Ferrer was a famous Puerto Rican actor and director. Fernández started playing tennis when she was seven. She studied at the prestigious Academia San José in Guaynabo.  When she turned professional in 1983, she became Puerto Rico's first female professional athlete. Before turning professional, she played tennis for one season at Clemson University in 1982–83, where she was singles and doubles All-American and reached the National Collegiate Athletics Association singles final.

Since retiring from the tour, Fernández has worked as a tennis coach. She has coached players including the former world No. 1 doubles player Rennae Stubbs, Lisa Raymond, and Samantha Stosur. She coached Sam Stosur to her first Grand Slam title at the 2005 US Open with Lisa Raymond. She also coached for the Puerto Rican national team and the University of South Florida.

She earned a Bachelor of Arts in psychology from the University of South Florida in 2003 and later graduated from Rollins College's Crummer School of Business where she earned a Master of Business Administration. She is the mother of twins, Karson Xavier and Madison Jane, and the partner of retired professional golfer and former LPGA and WWE executive Jane Geddes.

In 2010, Fernández started a company named Baby Goes Pro. She presently resides in Tampa, Florida and was the Director of Adult Tennis at Chelsea Piers Connecticut, as well as Summer Director at The Long Ridge Tennis Club.

In a 2021 interview, Fernández states she receives a lot of negative comments from some Puerto Ricans via her social media and that it saddens her.

Major finals

Grand Slam finals

Doubles: 23 (17–6)

Mixed doubles: 3 (0–3)

Olympic finals

Doubles: 2 (2 gold medals)

WTA Tour titles

Singles (2)

Doubles (69)
 1985: Washington (with Martina Navratilova), Miami (w/Navratilova), Toronto (w/Navratilova), Fort Lauderdale (with Robin White)
 1987: U.S. Indoor Championships (with Lori McNeil), Newport (w/McNeil), Mahwah (w/McNeil)
 1988: Tokyo Outdoor (w/White), US Open (w/White)
 1989: Newport (w/McNeil), Toronto (w/White), Tokyo Doubles Championships (w/White), Filderstadt (w/White)
 1990: Tokyo/Pan Pacific (with Elizabeth Smylie), Hamburg (w/Navratilova), Los Angeles (with Jana Novotná), US Open (w/Navratilova), New England (with Helena Suková)
 1991: Brisbane (w/Novotná), Chicago (w/Novotna), Light n' Lively Doubles (w/Suková), French Open (w/Novotna), Oakland (with Patty Fendick), Indianapolis (w/Fendick)
 1992: Houston (w/Fendick), French Open (with Natasha Zvereva), Wimbledon (w/Zvereva), Barcelona Olympics (with Mary Joe Fernández), US Open (w/Zvereva), Oakland (w/Zvereva), Philadelphia (w/Zvereva)
 1993: Australian Open (w/Zvereva), Delray Beach (w/Zvereva), Light n' Lively Doubles (w/Zvereva), Hilton Head (w/Zvereva), Berlin (w/Zvereva), French Open (w/Zvereva), Eastbourne (w/Zvereva), Wimbledon (w/Zvereva), San Diego (w/Suková), Leipzig (w/Zvereva), Filderstadt (w/Zvereva), Virginia Slims Championships (w/Zvereva)
 1994: Australian Open (w/Zvereva), Chicago (w/Zvereva), Miami (w/Zvereva), Italian Open (w/Zvereva), Berlin (w/Zvereva), French Open (w/Zvereva), Eastbourne (w/Zvereva), Wimbledon (w/Zvereva), Filderstadt (w/Zvereva), Philadelphia (w/Zvereva), Virginia Slims Championships (w/Zvereva)
 1995: Tokyo/Pan Pacific (w/Zvereva), Hamburg (with Martina Hingis), Rome (w/Zvereva), French Open (w/Zvereva), San Diego (w/Zvereva), Los Angeles (w/Zvereva), US Open (w/Zvereva), Filderstadt (w/Zvereva)
 1996: Tokyo/Pan Pacific (w/Zvereva), Atlanta Olympics (w/Mary Joe Fernández), San Diego (with Conchita Martínez), US Open (w/Zvereva)
 1997: Sydney (with Arantxa Sánchez Vicario), French Open (w/Zvereva), Wimbledon (w/Zvereva)

Doubles performance timeline

See also

History of women in Puerto Rico
List of Puerto Ricans
Monica Puig
Sports in Puerto Rico

References

External links
 
 
 
 

1964 births
American female tennis players
Australian Open (tennis) champions
Clemson Tigers women's tennis players
French Open champions
International Tennis Hall of Fame inductees
Grand Slam (tennis) champions in women's doubles
Lesbian sportswomen
Puerto Rican LGBT sportspeople
LGBT tennis players
Living people
Olympic gold medalists for the United States in tennis
Olympic tennis players of Puerto Rico
Sportspeople from San Juan, Puerto Rico
Sportspeople from Stamford, Connecticut
People from Seminole County, Florida
Puerto Rican female tennis players
Rollins College alumni
South Florida Bulls women's tennis coaches
Tennis people from Florida
Tennis players at the 1979 Pan American Games
Tennis players at the 1983 Pan American Games
Tennis players at the 1984 Summer Olympics
Tennis players at the 1992 Summer Olympics
Tennis players at the 1996 Summer Olympics
US Open (tennis) champions
Wimbledon champions
Medalists at the 1996 Summer Olympics
Medalists at the 1992 Summer Olympics
Pan American Games bronze medalists for Puerto Rico
Pan American Games silver medalists for Puerto Rico
Pan American Games medalists in tennis
Central American and Caribbean Games medalists in tennis
Central American and Caribbean Games gold medalists for Puerto Rico
Central American and Caribbean Games silver medalists for Puerto Rico
Central American and Caribbean Games bronze medalists for Puerto Rico
Medalists at the 1979 Pan American Games
Medalists at the 1983 Pan American Games
American tennis coaches
WTA number 1 ranked doubles tennis players